Bruce N. Northrup (born 1955 in Sussex, New Brunswick) is a Progressive Conservative politician in the province of New Brunswick, Canada. He was elected to the Legislative Assembly of New Brunswick in the 2006 election as the Progressive Conservative MLA for Kings East.
Northrup has acted as official Opposition critic for energy and NB Power issues.  He acted the critic for Department of Natural Resources interests and the official Opposition whip.  He was re-elected in September 2010, and served as the Minister of Natural Resources,
until the 2014 election of the 58th New Brunswick Legislature, at which time he became the Public Safety critic.

References

Living people
Members of the Executive Council of New Brunswick
Progressive Conservative Party of New Brunswick MLAs
1955 births
21st-century Canadian politicians